Jaymin Chauhan (born 14 November 1991) is an Indian cricketer. He made his List A debut for Gujarat in the 2018–19 Vijay Hazare Trophy on 24 September 2018.

References

External links
 

1991 births
Living people
Indian cricketers
Gujarat cricketers
Place of birth missing (living people)